The R360 road is a regional road in County Galway, Ireland. Southeast to northwest the route connects the town of Dunmore to Ballymoe.

See also
Roads in Ireland
National primary road
National secondary road

References
Roads Act 1993 (Classification of Regional Roads) Order 2006 – Department of Transport

Regional roads in the Republic of Ireland
Roads in County Galway